Young Women's Christian Association of Cincinnati is a historic building in Cincinnati, Ohio. It was listed in the National Register of Historic Places on September 16, 1982.

The Young Women's Christian Association of Cincinnati was founded in 1868.

The building hosts an active YWCA fitness facility.  It is located Downtown Cincinnati at Ninth Street and Walnut.

Notes

External links
YWCA Cincinnati

National Register of Historic Places in Cincinnati
Skyscrapers in Cincinnati
Residential buildings in Cincinnati
Athletics clubs in the United States
YWCA buildings
Clubhouses in Ohio
Residential skyscrapers in Ohio
1868 establishments in Ohio
History of women in Ohio